Mount Mende is a nunatak  southwest of Mount Lanzerotti, rising to about  in the Sky-Hi Nunataks of Ellsworth Land, Antarctica. It was named by the Advisory Committee on Antarctic Names in 1987 after Stephen B. Mende of the Lockheed Research Laboratory, Palo Alto, California, a Principal Investigator in upper atmosphere research, including auroral studies, carried out at Siple Station and South Pole Station from 1973 onwards.

References

Mountains of Palmer Land